Alexandro-Nevsky (masculine), Alexandro-Nevskaya (feminine), or Alexandro-Nevskoye (neuter) is the name of several inhabited localities in Russia.

Urban localities
Alexandro-Nevsky, Ryazan Oblast, a work settlement in Alexandro-Nevsky District of Ryazan Oblast

Rural localities
Alexandro-Nevsky, Chelyabinsk Oblast, a settlement in Balkansky Selsoviet of Nagaybaksky District of Chelyabinsk Oblast
Alexandro-Nevsky, Novosibirsk Oblast, a settlement in Bagansky District of Novosibirsk Oblast
Alexandro-Nevskoye, Republic of Dagestan, a selo in Tarumovsky District of the Republic of Dagestan
Alexandro-Nevskoye, Novosibirsk Oblast, a selo in Ubinsky District of Novosibirsk Oblast

See also
Alexandro-Nevsky Zavod, a rural locality (a selo) in Kuytunsky District of Irkutsk Oblast
Alexandro-Nevskaya Stanitsa, a rural locality (a village) in Kuytunsky District of Irkutsk Oblast
Alexandronevskaya, a rural locality (a stanitsa) in Vyselkovsky District of Krasnodar Krai